This is a list of the mayors of Girona, Spain from 1814.

Marià Berga (1814)
Narcís de Foixà (1814-1820)
Francesc de Delàs (1820-1821)
Francesc de Camps i Font (1821-1822)
Josep Antoni de Ferrer (1822-1823)
Valentí Comas (1823-1836)
Joan Danís (1836)
Narcís de Camps (1836-1838)
Narcís Germen (1838)
Marià Camps i de Niubò (1838)
Baldiri Simon (1838-1839)
Francesc Camps i Roger (1839-1840)
Antoni Martí i Serra (1840)
Francesc Camps i Roger (1840)
Marià Camps i de Niubò (1840-1841)
Narcís Sicars (1841)
Joan Urgell (1841-1842)
Joan Martell Domènech (1842)
Tomàs Narcís Blanch (1842)
Ramon Contreras (1842)
Joan Martell Domènech (1842-1843)
Marquès de la Torre (1843-1844)
Josep de Caramany (1844-1846)
Ventura Mercader (1846-1854)
Josep Coll (1854)
Joan Balari (1854-1856)
Marià Hernández (1856-1862)
Joaquim Rigau (1862-1863)
Ignasi Bassols (1863-1866)
Pere Viñas (1866-1867)
Joaquim de Cors i Guinart (1867-1868)
Francesc López Martínez (Corregidor) (1868)
Pere Barragán i García (Progressist) (1868-1869)
Joaquim Massaguer i Vidal (Progressist) (1869-1872)
Pere Barragán i García (Liberal) (1872-1873)
Joaquim Riera i Bertran (Federal) (1873)
Narcís Farró i Albert (Federal) (1873)
Josep Prats i Font (Federal) (1873)
Ignasi Bassols i de Rovira (1873-1874)
Pere Gahit i Vié (1874-1875)
Marià de Camps i de Feliu (1875-1877)
Josep Mollera i Calvet (1877-1880)
Pere Grahit i Vié (1880-1881)
Martí Coll i Lliura (1881-1882)
Joan Romaní i Miguel (1882-1883)
Francesc de P. Massa i Vall·llosera (1883-1885)
Andreu Tuyet i Santamaria (1885-1886)
Francesc de P. Massa i Vall·llosera (1886-1887)
Emili Grahit i Papell (1887-1891)
Agustí Garriga i Mundet (1891)
Andreu Tuyet Santamaria (1891-1892)
Francesc de Ciurana i Hernández (1892-1895)
Joaquim d'Espona i de Nuix (1895-1897)
Antoni Boxa i Bagué (1897-1899)
Manuel Català i Calzada (1899-1904)
Francesc de Ciurana i Hernández (1904-1906)
Frederic Bassols i Costa (1906-1907)
Manuel Català i Calzada (1907-1909)
Francesc Montsalvatge i Fossas (Lliga) (1909)
Francesc de Ciurana i Hernández (1909-1910)
Artur Vallès i Rigau (1910-1914)
Francesc Coll i Turbau (1914-1916)
Lluís de Llobet i de Pastors (1916-1917)
Frederic Bassols i Costa (1917)
Albert de Quintana i Serra (Lliga) (1917-1918)
Frederic Bassols i Costa (1918-1920)
Albert de Quintana i Serra (Lliga) (1920-1921)
Francesc Coll i Turbau (Lliga) (1921-1923)
Frederic Bassols i Costa (1923)
Lluís de Puig i Viladevall (1923-1924)
Joan Tarrús i Bru (1924)
Jaume Bartrina i Mas (1924-1925)
Frederic Bassols i Costa (1925-1927)
Jaume Bartrina i Mas (1927-1930)
Joaquim Tordera i Girbau (Republican) (1930)
Francesc Coll i Turbau (Lliga) (1930-1931)
Miquel Santaló i Parvorell (ERC) (1931-1934)
Josep Maria Dalmau i Casademont (ERC) (1934)
Francesc Tomàs i Martín (Lliga) (1934-1936)
Llorenç Busquets i Ventura (ERC) (1936)
Expedit Duran i Fernández (CNT) (1936-1937)
Llorenç Busquets i ventura (ERC) (1937)
Pere Cerezo i Hernáez (ERC) (1937-1939)
Joan Ballesta i Molinas (PSUC) (1939)
Joan Tarrús i Bru (1939)
Albert de Quintana i Vergés (1939-1946)
Antoni Franquet i Alemany (1946-1957)
Joan Maria de Ribot i de Balle (1957)
Pere Ordis i Llach (1957-1967)
Josep Bonet i Cufí (1967-1972)
Ignasi de Ribot i de Balle (1972-1979)
Joaquim Nadal (PSC-PSOE) (1979-2002)
Anna Pagans i Gruartmoner (PSC-PSOE) (2002-2011)
Carles Puigdemont (CiU) (2011-2016)
Isabel Muradàs Vázquez (Demòcrates de Catalunya) (2016)
Albert Ballesta Tura (CDC) (2016)
Eduard Berloso Ferrer (Demòcrates de Catalunya) (2016)
Marta Madrenas i Mir (CDC) (2016-Present)

Mayors Girona
Girona (Spain)
Gironès
Girona